Meixi District was a district of the city of Yichun in Heilongjiang Province in the People's Republic of China.

Meixi